Nuraz (also Romanized as Nūrāz; also known as Nūzār) is a village in Jalalvand Rural District, Firuzabad District, Kermanshah County, Kermanshah Province, Iran. According to the 2006 census, its population was 29, in 7 families.

References 

Populated places in Kermanshah County